Wham (also Lieber) is an unincorporated community located in Ouachita Parish, Louisiana, United States.

References

Unincorporated communities in Louisiana
Unincorporated communities in Ouachita Parish, Louisiana